Lugnano in Teverina is a comune (municipality) in the Province of Terni in the Italian region Umbria, located about 60 km south of Perugia and about 25 km west of Terni.

Lugnano in Teverina borders the following municipalities: Alviano, Amelia, Attigliano, Graffignano.

Main sights

The ancient Roman villa at Poggio Gramignano lay in the hills near the Tiber, 7 km from ancient Ameria in Umbrian territory. It was a large luxurious villa rustica with farm-estate attached. It has been partially excavated.

It was built in the late 1st c. BC when it included large room (oecus) with supporting columns and a unique flat-top pyramidal ceiling; the foundations and soil of the hill could not support the great weight leading to collapse of the colonnade and other southern rooms around the early 2nd century AD; in the early 3rd century, walls and support buttresses were built to try to stop further slippage but from this time the villa began to fall into ruin although it was still partially occupied; in the mid 5th century many rooms were reused as a cemetery for at least 47 children up to 3 years old who died perhaps of malaria.

Other sights:
Palazzo Pennone
Palazzo of the Bufalari Counts
Church of Santa Maria Assunta 
Convent of San Francesco

Necropolis

Nearby  is the  site known as the "Children's Necropolis", dating to the mid-5th century AD. The site includes the burial grounds of new-born and aborted fetuses. Some of the burials seem to have been so-called "vampire burials". These burial practices, such as inserting a stone into the mouth of the deceased, have been interpreted as means to prevent the rising of the dead. Modern research has indicated that many of the burials were victims of malaria, a disease whose origins were unknown until the 19th century. Vampire burials may have been practiced in the hope that the spread of disease would be curtailed.

References

External links
 Official website 

Cities and towns in Umbria
Poggio Gramignano